Robert Griffin "Bobby" Keppel (born June 11, 1982) is an American former professional baseball pitcher. He attended De Smet Jesuit High School in Creve Coeur, Missouri and while playing in the minor leagues attended the University of Notre Dame .

Career

MLB career
Keppel was selected by the New York Mets in the first round of the  draft (36th overall), with the compensation pick the Mets gained from the loss of free agent John Olerud. Keppel spent parts of six seasons in the team's farm system before signing a minor league contract with the Kansas City Royals. Keppel made his major league debut on May 25, eventually starting six games for the club.  In , he played in the Colorado Rockies' system. After starting the year 0–4, Keppel was sent to Colorado's Triple-A affiliate, the Colorado Springs Sky Sox, upon clearing waivers.

In , he played for the Florida Marlins' Triple-A affiliate, the Albuquerque Isotopes and became a free agent at the end of the season.  In December 2008, he signed a minor league contract with the Minnesota Twins. Keppel was recalled by the Twins on June 22, 2009.  On October 6, 2009, Keppel was the winning pitcher in the 2009 American League Central tie-breaker game that sent the Twins into the American League Division Series. On January 4, 2010, Keppel was released by Minnesota.

Hokkaido Nippon-Ham Fighters
On January 6, 2010, Keppel agreed to a contract with the Hokkaido Nippon-Ham Fighters in the Pacific League of Nippon Professional Baseball.

Return to the MLB
Keppel signed a minor league deal with the Cincinnati Reds on January 3, 2014. He elected free agency on November 7, 2015 and has not played professionally since.

References

External links

1982 births
Living people
Albuquerque Isotopes players
American expatriate baseball players in Japan
Baseball players from St. Louis
Binghamton Mets players
Brooklyn Cyclones players
Capital City Bombers players
Colorado Rockies players
Colorado Springs Sky Sox players
Hokkaido Nippon-Ham Fighters players
Kansas City Royals players
Kingsport Mets players
Major League Baseball pitchers
Minnesota Twins players
Norfolk Tides players
Omaha Royals players
Rochester Red Wings players
St. Lucie Mets players
University of Notre Dame alumni